Hedinichthys yarkandensis, the Kashgarian loach, is a species of stone loach in the genus Hedinichthys. It is found in the Tarim River basin. This species reaches a length of

References

yarkandensis
Freshwater fish of China
Endemic fauna of China
Taxa named by Francis Day
Fish described in 1877